Dacia: Revistă arheologică și de istorie veche is a Romanian academic journal of archeology published by the Vasile Pârvan Institute of Archaeology, Bucharest. It was established in 1924 by the Romanian historian and archaeologist Vasile Pârvan, in whose honor the institute was named. It has identical subsections in four languages: French, English, German and Russian.

See also 
 Romanian archaeology

External links 
 

Publications established in 1924
Archaeology journals
Archaeology of Romania
Multilingual journals